Andrew Disney is a Texas filmmaker and writer. He has attended the Tisch School of the Arts, where he received a BFA in Film Production.

Filmography

As director
What's It Worth (2003, also writer)
Frank's Last Shot (2007)
Searching for Sonny (2011, also writer)   
Balls Out (2014)
Crunch Time (2016)

References

External links
 
 

Tisch School of the Arts alumni
Living people
Year of birth missing (living people)
Place of birth missing (living people)
People from Fort Worth, Texas
Film directors from Texas